Through the Breakers is a 1928 American drama film directed by Joseph C. Boyle and starring Margaret Livingston, Holmes Herbert and Clyde Cook.

Cast
 Margaret Livingston as Diane Garrett  
 Holmes Herbert as Eustis Hobbs  
 Clyde Cook as John Lancaster  
 Natalie Joyce as Taya  
 Frank Hagney as Gamboa

References

Bibliography
 Steven Stack & Barbara Bowman. Suicide Movies: Social Patterns 1900-2009. Hogrefe Publishing, 2011.

External links

1928 films
1928 drama films
Silent American drama films
Films directed by Joseph Boyle
American silent feature films
1920s English-language films
American black-and-white films
Gotham Pictures films
1920s American films